Ochsner Medical Center – Kenner, also called Ochsner Kenner, is a hospital in Kenner, Louisiana, United States.

The 170-bed hospital opened in 1985 as St. Jude Hospital and was later renamed  Kenner Regional Medical Center.  The hospital was run by Tenet Healthcare until 2006 when it was acquired by Ochsner Health System.  After the acquisition, the hospital's name was changed to its current name.

References

External links

Hospital buildings completed in 1985
Hospitals in Louisiana
Buildings and structures in Jefferson Parish, Louisiana
Hospitals established in 1985